Pinball Construction Set is a video game by Bill Budge written for the Apple II. It was originally published in 1982 through Budge's own company, BudgeCo, then was released by Electronic Arts in 1983 along with ports to the Atari 8-bit family and Commodore 64.

The game created a new genre of video games: the construction set. Users can build and play their own virtual pinball machine by dropping bumpers, flippers, spinners, and other parts onto a table. Attributes such as gravity and the physics model can be modified. Tables can be saved to floppy disks and freely traded; Pinball Construction Set is not needed to play them.

Versions were released for the  IBM PC (as a self-booting disk) and Macintosh in 1985. EA followed Pinball Construction Set with Music Construction Set, Adventure Construction Set, and Racing Destruction Set all from different authors.

Development

Bill Budge, author of the Raster Blaster pinball game for the Apple II, began developing Pinball Construction Set in July 1982. He did not want to write another game ("all the current (arcade) games are either maze games or Pong; I didn't want any part of that"), but began experimenting with game and graphical tools he had written. As part of the development process he purchased and disassembled an old Gottlieb Target Alpha pinball machine, so his new project could accurately depict its components. Budge does not enjoy playing video games, and described having to play pinball for months while developing Pinball Construction Set as "sheer torture".

The project was ambitious given the Apple's limited memory and graphics capabilities. While Budge did not work on the Apple Lisa project as an Apple employee from 1980 to 1981 he was aware of it and the Graphic User Interface research at Xerox PARC, and gave Pinball Construction Set a Lisa-like user interface. He originally published and distributed the game via his publishing company BudgeCo in late 1982; the box art was a photograph of the parts of the disassembled pinball machine. It did not sell well, however, as BudgeCo did not have the distribution network that other, larger companies did. Budge agreed to have EA to publish his game when Trip Hawkins approached him in 1983. Raster Blaster and other projects had already made Budge a celebrity among Apple II owners, and his name was much larger than the name of the software on EA's Pinball Construction Set box art.

Reception
Pinball Construction Sets sales had surpassed 250,000 copies by November 1989, and it ultimately sold over 300,000 copies in all platforms.

Pinball Construction Sets scope and flexibility on a 48K Apple II was impressive. Steve Wozniak called it "the greatest program ever written for an 8-bit machine", and for thousands the software was their first experience with a GUI. Computer Gaming World in 1983 considered the software toy revolutionary, and easy to understand because of its representative icons and drag-and-drop method of constructing a table; the magazine stated that "there's something almost magical about the way this product works. You take everything it does for granted after just a few minutes". The nine-page manual was considered "overkill", since Pinball Construction Set required no programming knowledge; an eight-year-old had no problems creating his own tables. Reviewing the Atari version in their "Arcade Alley" column, Video magazine described Pinball Construction Set as a "remarkably clever and easy-to-use program", and noted that a third-party company had already published a suite of pre-made pinball games for use with the construction set.

"I found this to be an incredibly complete kit", BYTE stated in 1984, praising Budge's "marvelous sense of programming ... I can only say, 'Wow! I wish I wrote that.'" The magazine reported that "Creativity is encouraged. [Users] are gently encouraged and aided. This is valuable for children and inexperienced players and computer users". InfoWorld compared the game's importance to that of Scott Adams's Adventureland, and predicted that it "is sure to have lots of children and grandchildren". Ahoy! wrote "you owe it to yourself to pick up Pinball Construction Set. It is among the best home entertainment programs ever written". The Addison-Wesley Book of Atari Software 1984 gave the "pinball wizard's dream" an overall A+ rating, praising the user interface as "exceptionally human engineered". Compute! listed it in 1988 as one of "Our Favorite Games", calling the game "a programming work of art ... a classic that never seems to grow old". Orson Scott Card stated in the magazine in 1989 that the program was so flexible that his son used it as a graphics program.

Awards
In 1984 Pinball Construction Set received a Certificate of Merit in the category of "1984 Most Innovative Video Game/Computer Game" at the 5th annual Arkie Awards. One month later Softline readers named the game the ninth most-popular Apple and Atari program of 1983. Computer Gaming World in 1996 declared Pinball Construction Set the 50th-best computer game ever released, and ranked it #1 in the magazine's list of the most innovative computer games. Pinball Construction Set is an inductee in GameSpy's Hall of Fame. In 2008, Pinball Construction Set was honored at the 59th Annual Technology and Engineering Emmy Awards for "User Generated Content/Game Modification".

Legacy
A version for the Coleco Adam combined with Hard Hat Mack under the title The Best of Electronic Arts was completed but not released.

In 1993, Budge wrote a version of Pinball Construction Set for the  Sega Genesis with the name Virtual Pinball.

Will Wright cited the game as an inspiration.

In 2013, Budge released the source code to the Atari 8-bit family version of Pinball Construction Set to the public on GitHub under the MIT license.

References

External links

Pinball Construction Set at Atari Mania

1982 video games
Apple II games
Ariolasoft games
Atari 8-bit family games
Commercial video games with freely available source code
Commodore 64 games
Electronic Arts games
Formerly proprietary software
Classic Mac OS games
Open-source video games
Pinball video games
Software using the MIT license
Video game development software
Video game level editors
Video games developed in the United States